Pechenizhyn (Pechinizhn) is an urban-type settlement in Kolomyia Raion, Ivano-Frankivsk Oblast (province) of Ukraine,  west of Kolomyya. It hosts the administration of Pechenizhyn settlement hromada, one of the hromadas of Ukraine.

History
The settlement is first mentioned in 1443 as a village belonging to Johann Kolia from Deleyiv. During the 15-17th centuries the territory of Pechenizhyn has developed into a separate estate known as Pechenizhyn Klyuch (Pechenizhyn Key) that included seven villages.

Since the 15th century Pechenizhyn was part of Kolomyja County (powiat) in Ruthenian Voivodeship, Kingdom of Galicia and Lodomeria, and Stanislawow Voivodeship. In 1890 the Jewish population of the town was 2024.

In 1886 the town was connected with Kolomea by the Carpathian Train, also known as a train car as it would go right through a city on a narrow railway.
The Polish lawyer, diplomat, and the owner of the local oil refinery Stanislaw Szczepanowski supported the idea of installation of the local railroad system that was proposed by Ludowik Vezhbicki, the head of Lviv-Chernivtsi railroad (see Lviv Railways). He created a concern together with Vienna-based company "M.Biedermann & Co". The construction was conducted by another Vienna firm "Lindheim & Co" under the leadership of engineer Rudolf Matkovski. After the Soviet liberation in 1944 it was utilized by the NKVD forces for deportation of the local population to Siberia.
Before World War I on the outskirts of the town there was a palace of Potocki family, the biggest Polish magnates (landowners) in Ukraine.
Birthplace of Oleksa Dovbush, the "Ukrainian Robin Hood" in the 18th century,
Shtetl in the Kolomyia powiat (administrative district) in 19th and 20th centuries.

Demographics
1913: total population 7000 (4100 Ukrainians (Rusyns), 2300 Jews, 600 Poles)

Notable people
 Oleksa Dovbush (1700–1745), a peasant insurgent against serfdom
 Volodymyr Hrabovetskyi (1928–2015), Ukrainian historian, doctor of historical sciences

External links 
Pechenezhin Jewish Cemetery fully documented at Jewish Galicia and Bukovina ORG

References

Urban-type settlements in Kolomyia Raion
Stanisławów Voivodeship
Shtetls